"Love Will Tear Us Apart" is a song by the British band Joy Division. 

Love Will Tear Us Apart can also refer to:

 Love Will Tear Us Apart (1999 film), a Hong Kong indie film
 Love Will Tear Us Apart (2013 film), a Chinese film